50 Years is a 2012 album by The Dubliners.

50 Years or Fifty Years may also refer to:

"50 Years" (song), by Uncanny X-Men, 1985
50 Years, an album by Happy Goodman Family, 2000
Fifty Years: The Artistry of Tony Bennett, an album by Tony Bennett, 2004

See also

Fifty-Year Peace Treaty